The Chimichurri burger (usually called "Chimi burger", "Dominican burger", or simply "chimi") is a traditional snack dish (sandwich) served in the Dominican Republic. 

It is made from ground pork or beef, which is sliced, grilled and served on a pan de agua (literally "water bread") and garnished with chopped cabbage. Salsa golf is also added. This dish is made throughout the Dominican Republic and is usually sold on street stands. Each vendor has their own recipe; flavors and ingredients can substantially vary the texture and taste of the chimichurris.

Outside the Dominican Republic 
Chimichurris are popularly sold out of food trucks in the Dominican Republic and in various areas of the United States. Such areas include: Washington Heights, Manhattan, New York; Corona, Queens, New York; Brooklyn, New York; Paterson, New Jersey; the Allapattah area of Miami, Florida; East and South Orlando, Florida; Lawrence, Massachusetts; north of San Antonio, Texas; and in Providence, Rhode Island.

Origin 
Although the precise origins of the Dominican chimi remain unclear, many across the island credit the burger to the Argentinian cook Juan Abrales, who moved to the Dominican Republic from Argentina in the 1970s. The burger is similar to popular street food in Argentina where they top sandwiches, hotdogs, grilled meats, and chorizo with chimichurri sauce and slaw. Salsa golf has its origin in Argentina where the sauce is used for shrimp, fried foods, hotdogs, sandwiches, and burgers.

See also
List of sandwiches

References

Dominican Republic cuisine
Hamburgers (food)
Beef sandwiches
Pork sandwiches